Durgada, formerly Durga Ooda or Durga Vaahini, is a rural village in Gollaprolu Mandal,  Kakinada district, Andhra Pradesh, India. It is located northeast of Pithapuram  and Gollaprolu. The village is located 1.8 kilometers away from NH 214 and 3 kilometers away from NH 5. The nearest city (35 km) is Kakinada. 

The village has rail access through a halt, and the nearest railway stations are Ravikampadu East Godavari (2.6 km) and Gollaprolu (9.2 km). The nearest railway junction is Samalkot. The nearest airstrip is Madhurapudi, Rajahmundry (75 km) and the nearest airport is Vishakapatnam (125 km). The nearest seaport is Kakinada Port.

Transport
Roadways: There was once an APSRTC bus facility, but now there is no public bus facility. The people depend on Autorikshas.

Railways: There is a Railway Gate halt in the village. There are 2 passenger trains available every day. among 2, 1 is towards Vishakapatnam and the remaining  is towards Samalkot Junction.

History
It is unknown when the village was built, but Pullakavi, a famous author, lived in Durgada in the 15th century. There are some monuments and buildings that show the signs of British colonial rule. it was under the rule of Rao Venkata Kumara Mahipati Surya Rau Maharaja of Pithapuram for a period of time.

Demographics
As of the census of 2011, there were 10,717 people residing in the village. The population density was 740 people per square kilometer (1,900/sq mi). There were 3075 households within the village. Males constitute 50.1% of the population and females 49.9%. Durgada has an average literacy rate of 53%, substantially lower than the national average of 74%. Male literacy is at 28.1%, while female literacy is 24.9%. In Durgada, 11.1% of the population is age 6 or under.

Work Profile
Most of the people in the village are small and marginal farmers having less than 5 acres of agricultural land and some people are Agricultural labour. Fewer people are engaged in other works such as mango pickle manufacturing and selling gold by the gram. Many residents work in Indian railways, the Banking sector, Software, and the Teaching field.

Education
Many residents have completed Graduation or Post Graduation. Some people have completed Professional degrees (Chartered Accountants, Cost Accountants).

Caste Profile 
Most castes are found here. About half of the people are Kapu, and Schedule castes constitute 12% of the population.

Crops
As there is no irrigation by rivers or canals, people depend on groundwater irrigation. The people in the village cultivate less water-consuming crops.
The most famous crops in Durgada are:
Onion
Buriaya Mirchi (small round bell type mirchi)
catton
sugar cane
coconut
oil palm
mango
Gingilly Seeds
papaya
Pulses
Banana(All types)
Paddy(Two crops)
Vegetables
Water melon
Ground nuts

Most of the people will cultivate two crops per year such onions during kharif crop and sesame or watermelon during Rabi or some other vegetable crops.

Temples 
The people in the Village are very spiritual. They support many local temples.

Sri Panchayatana sametha Uma Ramalingeswara Temple
శ్రీ పంచాయతన సమేత శ్రీ ఉమా రామలింగేశ్వర మందిరం  (శివాలయం ): This Temple is located north to south to the village. The idol in the temple was said to be installed by  Rama in Treta Yuga during his exile (vanavaasam)(వనవాసం).

Sri Kanaka Durga Temple
శ్రీ కనక దుర్గ గుడి :
This is located east of the village.

Sri Vegulamma Temple
శ్రీ వేగులమ్మ తల్లి దేవాలయం   : Sri vegulamma ammavaru is the Gramadevata గ్రామ దేవత (village deity)

Sri Saibaba Temple(2 temples)
One temple is located in the lane between fresh water pond(మంచి నీటి చెరువు  ) and Meraka Veedhi Raamalayam(మెరక వీధి రామాలయం ). This temple is constructed by Dwibhashyam Laxmi Pathi( ద్విభాష్యం  లక్ష్మీపతి  ). And another temple is located at Durga Ghiri(దుర్గ గిరి ). This was constructed by the village people under the guidance of Ammula Sai Trust.

Other Temples
Sri Abhayanjaneya Idol(శ్రీ అభయ ఆంజనేయ స్వామి వారి ఆలయం)
Sri Bavana Rushi Sametha Bhadravathi temple(శ్రీ భావనా ఋషి సామెత భద్రావతి అమ్మవార్ల ఆలయం)
Sri Bala Ganapathi Temple(శ్రీ బాల గణపతి దేవాలయం) 
Sri Ganapthi Temple (శ్రీ గణపతి దేవాలయం)
Pallapu Veedhi Raamalayam (పల్లపు వీధి రామాలయం)
Meraka Veedhi Raamalayam (మెరక వీధి రామాలయం)
Thotalo Rammalayam (Kothapeta Raamalayam)(?కొత్తపేట రామాలయం)
Sri Krisha Ramalayam (శ్రీ కృష్ణ రామాలయం)
Guruvu Gari Aashramam (గురువు గారి ఆశ్రమం)
Sri Sumangala Kalyana Venkateswara Swami (శ్రీ సుమంగళ కళ్యాణ వెంకటేశ్వర స్వామి ఆలయం) (under construction). This would be the largest temple in the village, when finished.

other than these Hindu temples there are 
one mosque.
3 to 4 churches.

References 

Villages in Gollaprolu mandal